Richard Joseph Devereux (1829–1883) was an Irish Liberal politician.

Devereux was elected MP as the Member of Parliament (MP) for Wexford Borough—a seat his brother John Thomas Devereux held between 1847 and 1859—in the 1865 general election and held the seat until he resigned in 1872.

References

External links
 

1829 births
1883 deaths
UK MPs 1865–1868
UK MPs 1868–1874
Irish Liberal Party MPs
Members of the Parliament of the United Kingdom for County Wexford constituencies (1801–1922)